Benjamin Hall, 1st Baron Llanover  (8 November 1802 – 27 April 1867), known as Sir Benjamin Hall between 1838 and 1859, was a Welsh civil engineer and politician.  The famous "Big Ben" may have been named for him.

Background
Hall was a son of the industrialist Benjamin Hall. He went to Westminster School.

Political career
He was a Sheriff of Monmouthshire in 1826. He was elected Member of Parliament for Monmouth in May 1831, but his name was erased from the return already in July of the same year. However, he was successfully re-elected for the same constituency in December 1832. He was instrumental in the passing of the Truck Acts of 1831 and campaigned against the abuse of parliamentary election expenses and championed the right of people in Wales to have religious services in Welsh. He also engaged in bitter controversy with the bishops on the state of the Anglican church in Wales and made attacks on the shameless exploitation of church revenues, complaining of unbounded nepotism. In 1837 he was returned for Marylebone and the following year he was created a baronet.

He served under Lord Aberdeen and then Lord Palmerston as President of the Board of Health between 1854 and 1855 and was sworn of the Privy Council in 1854. In 1855 he introduced an Act of Parliament which led to the establishment of the Metropolitan Board of Works. 

He became First Commissioner of Works the same year and was responsible for many environmental and sanitary improvements in London. He oversaw the later stages of the rebuilding of the Houses of Parliament, including the installation of the 13.8-tonne hour bell, "Big Ben", in the clock tower. He was a tall man and many attribute its name to him. 

He remained as First Commissioner of Works under parliament until the Whigs lost power in 1858. The following year he was elevated to the peerage as Baron Llanover, of Llanover and Abercarn in the County of Monmouth. From 1861 to 1867 he was Lord Lieutenant of Monmouthshire.

Through his wife, Augusta Waddington, Hall inherited the Llanover estate in Monmouthshire.

Personal life
Lord Llanover married Augusta, daughter of Benjamin and Georgina Waddington of Ty Uchaf, Llanover in 1823. She was the sister of and co-heiress with Frances Bunsen, wife of the Prussian diplomat Baron Bunsen.

Only one of their daughters reached adulthood. Augusta married Arthur Jones of Llanarth. Their son was Ivor Herbert, 1st Baron Treowen. Lord Llanover died in April 1867, aged 64, when the baronetcy and barony became extinct. Lady Llanover survived him by almost thirty years and died in January 1896.

References

External links
 Profile, OxfordDNB.com
 Profile, ukonline.co.uk
 
 The Story of Big Ben

1802 births
1867 deaths
People educated at Westminster School, London
Barons in the Peerage of the United Kingdom
British civil engineers
Lord-Lieutenants of Monmouthshire
Members of the Privy Council of the United Kingdom
High Sheriffs of Monmouthshire
Whig (British political party) MPs for Welsh constituencies
Whig (British political party) MPs for English constituencies
UK MPs 1831–1832
UK MPs 1832–1835
UK MPs 1835–1837
UK MPs 1837–1841
UK MPs 1841–1847
UK MPs 1847–1852
UK MPs 1852–1857
UK MPs 1857–1859
UK MPs who were granted peerages
Peers of the United Kingdom created by Queen Victoria